WVHF could mean:

 1140 WVHF (AM) Kentwood, Michigan — formerly WJNZ from 2003 to 2010
 WWJS-CD channel 15, in Jeffersonville, Indiana, formerly used the call sign WVHF
 WJYL-CD channel 16, in Jeffersonville, Indiana  — a low-power TV station that was WVHF-LD then WVHF-CA from 2002 to 2008
 92.7 WGIE Clarksburg, West Virginia — was WVHF-FM until 2001